Mutab Sharahili  (born 19 November 1992) is a Saudi Arabian football goalkeeper who currently plays for Al-Arabi.

Career
At the club level, Mutab Sharahili began his career playing for Al-Nassr. He was promoted to the first team during the 2014–15 season.

On 3 July 2022, Sharahili joined First Division side Al-Arabi.

Honours

Clubs
Al-Nassr
Saudi Professional League 2014–15

Damac 
First Division runner-up: 2018–19

Al-Khaleej 
First Division: 2021–22

References

1992 births
Living people
Saudi Arabian footballers
Al Nassr FC players
Al-Raed FC players
Damac FC players
Hetten FC players
Khaleej FC players
Al-Arabi SC (Saudi Arabia) players
Saudi First Division League players
Sportspeople from Riyadh
Saudi Professional League players
Association football goalkeepers